Michael Fitzpatrick (born 26 September 1973) is an Australian radio personality and programmer.

He is currently Group Content Director the Triple M Network and Head of Content at Triple M Melbourne.

He anchored The Cage breakfast show on Triple M Melbourne, Sydney & Adelaide with James Brayshaw, Peter Berner, Brigitte Duclos and Matt Parkinson from January 2002 until November 2007.

His TV acting credits include Australian drama's Heartbreak High and G. P.. He has also appeared as the host of Video Cliches and Most Wanted for MTV Australia; appeared on Channel Ten's Joker Poker and Channel Nine's Hole in the Wall.

He was listed in the magazine Cleo as one of the 50 Most Eligible Bachelors in 2003 & 2005.

References

External links

1973 births
Living people
Australian radio personalities
Australian music critics
Australian music journalists